Hellana Games is an Italian gaming convention organized by gamers in Agliana, Tuscany. The 2010 editions got 2,000 attendees. There is a focus on playing, with numerous tables and events devoted to gaming.

History
Hellana Games started in 2000. 

From 2000 to 2018 in Agliana, GLA focused on demonstration tables. It attracted name like Giuseppe Rava a historical and military illustrator.

Hellana includes board games, table-top miniatures games and war-games. There is a modelling sector.

References

External links 

Gaming conventions
Tourist attractions in Tuscany
Recurring events established in 2000
2000 establishments in Italy